Jana Rae Kramer (born December 2, 1983) is an American country music singer and actress.  She is known for her role as Alex Dupre on the television series One Tree Hill.

Kramer began her musical career in 2012 and has released two albums: Jana Kramer (2012) and Thirty One (2015). The albums produced seven charted singles on Hot Country Songs and Country Airplay, including the top 10 hits "Why Ya Wanna" and "I Got the Boy". She competed on season 23 of Dancing with the Stars, finishing in fourth place.

Early life
Kramer was born in Rochester Hills, Michigan, to Nora and Martin Kramer, who is of German descent. Kramer attended Rochester Adams High School. She speaks some German. She has an older brother, Steve, who is a sergeant at the Oakland County Sheriff's Office. She lived in Dearborn, Michigan, for some time after her parents divorced. She moved to California when she was 18 for two years, then moved to Tennessee.

Career

2002–2011: Acting career and record deal
In 2002, Kramer made her acting debut in the low-budget independent horror film Dead/Undead. The following year Kramer guest appeared on All My Children, which marked Kramer's television debut. Kramer has since continued to appear in a number of television shows such as CSI: Crime Scene Investigation, Grey's Anatomy, Private Practice and CSI: NY. She has also had small supporting roles in films such as Return of the Living Dead: Necropolis, Click, Prom Night, Heart of the Country, and Country Crush. She was also in Spring Breakdown.

In 2007, Kramer appeared in a recurring role on the NBC sports drama television series Friday Night Lights. She played the role of Noelle Davenport in the series' second season. In 2008, Kramer appeared in The CW teen drama series 90210, a reboot of the 1990s teen drama television series Beverly Hills 90210. Kramer played the role of high school student Portia Ranson and made her debut in the first season's second episode "The Jet Set". Her role went on for six episodes and Kramer made her final appearance in "The Party's Over", which aired May 5, 2009. In 2009, Kramer appeared on the HBO dramedy television series Entourage. Kramer played the role of a sorority girl who seduces the character Turtle (Jerry Ferrara), and appeared in four episodes.

In June 2009, it was announced Kramer would star in the CW drama television series seventh season of One Tree Hill. Kramer played the role of Alex Dupre, an actress and tabloid darling who becomes the new face of Brooke Davis's fashion line, "Clothes Over Bros", and creates havoc for the residents of Tree Hill. Kramer made her debut in the season's first episode. Initially Kramer's appearance on the show was meant to be in a recurring form, but her role was upgraded to a series regular by the season's fourteenth episode, "Family Affair". In March 2012, Kramer announced she would not appear regularly in the show's ninth and final season in order to pursue her music career. Kramer made her final appearance in the second episode of the ninth season, "In the Room Where You Sleep", which aired on January 18, 2012.

In February 2011, Kramer signed a recording contract with Elektra Records. That same month she premiered her promo track, "I Won't Give Up", which premiered in the One Tree Hill episode, "Holding Out for a Hero", and was released the following day exclusively on iTunes and Amazon. The song reached number 75 on the US Billboard Hot 100 chart. The following month Kramer began work on her debut album. Country music producer Scott Hendricks produced the majority of the record. In April 2011, Kramer released another promo track, titled "Whiskey", which she also performed on One Tree Hill. The song reached number 99 on the Billboard Hot 100 chart on digital sales alone.

2012–2018: Jana Kramer, and Dancing with the Stars
In February 2012, Kramer was cast as the protagonist in the independent drama film, Heart of the Country, playing the role of a privileged young woman, Faith Carraday, who is following her show-biz dreams but leaves it all and moves to rural North Carolina after her husband is jailed for Wall Street fraud. Kramer is also attached to a horror film named The Gatekeeper.

On January 16, 2012, Kramer released her official debut single, "Why Ya Wanna". Kramer premiered the official music video, directed by Kristin Barlowe, on February 6, 2012. The song peaked at number 52 on the US Billboard Hot 100 chart and number 3 on the Billboard Hot Country Songs chart. "Whiskey" is the album's second official single. On June 1, 2012, Kramer made her first televised live performance on Fox & Friends to promote her debut album. She performed "Why Ya Wanna" in front of a crowd of fans in New York City. On June 5, 2012, Kramer released her self-titled debut album Jana Kramer. The record received positive reviews from critics with many praising Kramer's vocal performance.

On June 5, 2013, Nationwide Insurance released the first of a series of commercials in its "Join the Nation" campaign, featuring Kramer as a stealthy woman dressed in black leather who follows a team of burglars and replaces the items they steal with newer versions to promote Nationwide's "Brand New Belongings" initiative. Nationwide had signed Kramer to sing the Nationwide jingle in August 2012. A second commercial, released in April 2014, featured Kramer's character replacing items in a fire-blackened apartment to promote Nationwide's renters' insurance. In November 2014, Jana reprised her Nationwide role, this time as a sexy Santa Claus-like figure replacing items during Christmas season. Nationwide's advertising partner McKinney is behind the spots.

In July 2013, Kramer opened for Blake Shelton on his Ten Times Crazier Tour in Virginia Beach, VA. In August 2013, the independent film Approaching Midnight starring Kramer had its world premiere at the Emagine Royal Oak in Michigan.

Personal life
Kramer married Michael Gambino in 2004. They divorced several months later, after Kramer suffered severe domestic abuse that led to Gambino's 2005 conviction on attempted murder charges. On December 22, 2009, Kramer became engaged to actor Johnathon Schaech, whom she had met on the set of Prom Night. They married on July 4, 2010, in Michigan. The couple separated a month later. Their divorce was finalized in June 2011. Kramer met country music singer Brantley Gilbert in June 2012 CMT Music Awards. They later began dating and became engaged on January 20, 2013, his 28th birthday, but ended their relationship in August 2013.

In August 2014, Kramer began dating Washington Redskins tight end Mike Caussin, whom she met on Twitter. She announced just weeks later on social media and during a show, however, that they had split up because he cheated on her. Shortly after that, she publicly forgave him, and they got back together. During CMA week in November 2014, Kramer spoke for the first time about her failed relationship with Gilbert, saying she was in an unhealthy place and as a result, picked unhealthy relationships. She spoke of her relationship with Caussin saying she was now in a healthy place and a healthy relationship. Kramer and Caussin became engaged in December 2014 on her 31st birthday, and were married on May 22, 2015.

On August 10, 2015, the couple revealed they were expecting their first child, a girl. Kramer gave birth to their daughter, Jolie Rae Caussin, on January 31, 2016. By August 2016, Kramer and Caussin had separated in the midst of Caussin's admission into rehab for undisclosed purposes. They reconciled the following year and renewed their wedding vows in December 2017. In April 2018, Kramer and Caussin shared their battle with his sex addiction, revealing that the addiction was a root cause for his infidelities. In July of that year, Kramer announced she was expecting her second child, a boy. Kramer gave birth to their son, Jace Joseph Caussin, on November 29, 2018.

On April 20, 2021, Kramer filed for divorce from Caussin, citing "inappropriate marital conduct, irreconcilable differences and adultery". Two days after the pair split, a temporary restraining order was issued by the Williamson County, Tennessee, court. Per E! News it was speculated that Caussin had cheated on Kramer with more than 13 women.

On May 20, 2021, it was reported that Kramer and Caussin reached an agreement with custody and child support. According to the documents, Kramer was awarded primary custody of Jolie and Jace. She will have the children 240 days out of the year, while Caussin will have them for the remaining 125 days. In addition, Caussin is to pay Kramer $3,200 per month in child support. The divorce was finalized on July 22, 2021.

From September 2021 to October 2021, Kramer dated former Chicago Bears quarterback, Jay Cutler.

On January 11, 2022, Kramer publicly confirmed, on Instagram, her relationship with fitness trainer and Navy veteran, Ian Schinelli. It was reported that the two had been dating since late 2021. The relationship ended in April 2022.

Filmography

Film

Television

Dancing with the Stars
On August 30, 2016, Kramer was announced as one of the celebrities who would compete on season 23 of Dancing with the Stars. She was partnered with professional partner Gleb Savchenko. Kramer and Savchenko reached the finals of the show and finished in 4th place.

1 Score given by guest judge Pitbull.2 Score given by guest judge Idina Menzel.

Discography 
 

 Jana Kramer (2012)
 Thirty One (2015)

Awards and nominations

References

External links
 
 

1983 births
21st-century American actresses
American people of German descent
Actresses from Detroit
American country singer-songwriters
American women country singers
American film actresses
American television actresses
Country musicians from Michigan
Elektra Records artists
Living people
People from Rochester, Michigan
Singers from Detroit
21st-century American singers
21st-century American women singers
Singer-songwriters from Michigan